The Cambrian Hardyston Formation or Hardyston Quartzite is a mapped bedrock unit in Pennsylvania and New Jersey.

It was originally described by Wolff and Brooks in 1898, where two outcrops in Hardyston Township, Sussex County, New Jersey, were described.

Description
Richard Dalton described the Hardyston Formation in 1989 as having a varying lithology.  It is composed of a vitreous, light pink, steel gray or brown, locally arkosic, fine to coarse-grained, resistant quartzite. Pebble conglomerate is common at the base of the formation. Locally, where the unit is less than 10 ft thick, it is a fine- to medium-grained, gray, pyritic quartzite, grading into a dark-gray dolomitic sandstone.

Stratigraphy
The Hardyston unconformably overlies Precambrian crystalline basement rocks where it was deposited on an irregular surface and fills only the troughs or depressions. It gradationally underlies the Leithsville Formation of the Kittatinny Supergroup.

The Hardyston occurs in New Jersey only in the highly folded and faulted New Jersey Highlands, northeast of the much younger Mesozoic Newark Basin.

Miller and Myers extended the formation into Pennsylvania in 1939, where it underlies the Tomstown Dolomite.

Notable outcrops 
 Cushion Peak, Berks County, Pennsylvania - the Hardyston has been thrust faulted over the limestone valley at this site

Age 
Relative age dating places the Hardyston in the Early Cambrian.

Fossil content 
Trilobites have been found in the calcareous sandstone beds of the formation.  One genus is Olenellus.

References 

Cambrian System of North America
Cambrian geology of New Jersey
Cambrian geology of Pennsylvania
Geologic formations of New Jersey
Geologic formations of Pennsylvania
Quartzite formations
Paleontology in New Jersey
Paleontology in Pennsylvania